M2-class zeppelin LZ 32, given tactical number L 7, was a rigid airship operated by the Kaiserliche Marine, which flew 164 times, including 77 reconnaissance missions over the North Sea, with several unsuccessful attempts to attack English coastal towns.

Crash
While on a mission, LZ 32 was spotted by light cruisers  and  who opened fire on the airship. Just as they were doing this  was operating with the sea plane carrier  in the North Sea in an air raid on the Zeppelin sheds at Tondern on 4 May 1916. E31 surfaced and spotted the airship, but being vulnerable on the surface, the sub dived to avoid attack. E31 then surfaced just in time to get in the fatal shot and brought the Zeppelin down.  then proceeded to rescue seven survivors from the crew of LZ 32.

Specifications (LZ 37 / M2-class zeppelin)

See also
List of Zeppelins

References

Bibliography

Zeppelins
Hydrogen airships
Military airships of World War I
Airships of the Imperial German Navy
1916 in Germany
Aircraft first flown in 1914